The commune of Mwakiro is a commune of Muyinga Province in northeastern Burundi. The capital lies at Mwakiro.

References

Communes of Burundi
Muyinga Province